Vikno may refer to several places in Ukraine:

Vikno, Horodenka Raion
Vikno, Chernivtsi Oblast